Sultan Abdul Jamal Shah ibni Almarhum Sultan Zainal Abidin Shah (died 1575) is the ninth Sultan of Pahang who reigned from 1560 to 1575. Known as Raja Jamal before his accession, he was the second son of the seventh Sultan of Pahang, Zainal Abidin Shah by his royal wife, Raja Putri Dewi binti al-Marhum Sultan Mahmud Shah, daughter of the last Sultan of Melaka. He reigned jointly with his younger brother, Raja Kadir.

References

Bibliography

1575 deaths
16th-century Sultans of Pahang
16th-century murdered monarchs
Murder in 1575